Maculabatis bineeshi, the short-tail whipray, is a species of stingray in the family Dasyatidae.
It is found in the Indian Ocean: around Pakistan and India, also in the Bay of Bengal.

References

bineeshi
Taxa named by Bernadette Mabel Manjaji-Matsumoto
Taxa named by Peter R. Last
Fish described in 2016